Ashish Kakkad (21 May 1971 – 2 November 2020) was an Indian film director, writer, actor and voice artist from Ahmedabad, Gujarat. He primarily worked in the Gujarati cinema.

Biography
He was interested in theatre and film production since his college days.

He was a pioneer who revived the Gujarati cinema with his 2010 film Better Half which was set in urban backdrop and made with modern filmmaking. The film was critically acclaimed. He had lent his voice in many documentaries and short films. He acted in several Gujarati films and few Hindi films.

He died on 2 November 2020 at 3:45 pm in Kolkata at the age of 49 following a severe heart attack.

Filmography

Direction and writing
 Better Half (2010)
 Mission Mummy (2016)

Acting
 Kai Po Che! (Hindi, 2013)
 Bey Yaar (2014)
 Beyond Blue: An Unnerving Tale of a Demented Mind (Hindi, 2015)
 Paghadi
 Vitamin She (2017)
 Tame Keva? (2018)
 Suraynsh (2018)
 Naadi Dosh (2022)

References

Further reading

External links
 

1971 births
2020 deaths
Gujarati-language film directors
21st-century Indian film directors
Indian male screenwriters
Artists from Ahmedabad
Gujarati people
Film directors from Gujarat
Film producers from Gujarat
Indian film actors